Brionna Jones (born December 18, 1995) is an American professional basketball center for the Connecticut Sun of the Women's National Basketball Association (WNBA) and currently with USK Prague of the Czech Women's Basketball League. She was drafted with the 8th overall pick in the 2017 WNBA draft.

Early life
Jones was born to Michael and Sanciarhea Jones. Jones is from Havre de Grace, Maryland. She has an older brother Jarred, a younger sister Stephanie, and a younger brother Jordan. She attended Aberdeen High School, and led her high school to a state championship her junior year.

College career 
Jones attended the University of Maryland, where she graduated in three years and majored in kinesiology.

WNBA career 
In the 2017 WNBA Draft Jones was selected 8th overall by the Connecticut Sun .

Jones In the 2020 WNBA Bubble broke out and showed signs of top super-star potential .

in 2021 Jones had her breakout year averaging 14.7 points, 7.3 rebounds, 1.8 assists and 30.6 minutes while starting all 32 games for the Sun this season. Her previous career highs in each of those categories were all set with the Sun in 2020, when she averaged 11.2 points, 5.6 rebounds, 1.0 assists and 26.1 minutes in 21 games. Jones was selected as a 2021 WNBA All Star  . Jones helped the Sun post the highest winning percentage in franchise history (.813) and finish the regular season with 14 consecutive victories for the fourth-longest winning streak in WNBA history. With her improvement and her becoming one of the next stars in the WNBA Jones was named the 2021 WNBA Most Improved Player Award, Jones was also named to the 2021 WNBA All Defensive Second Team .

WNBA career statistics

Regular season 

|-
| style="text-align:left;"| 2017
| style="text-align:left;"| Connecticut
| 23 || 0 || 6.4 || .575 || .000 || .833 || 1.7 || 0.1 || 0.4 || 0.1 || 0.4 || 2.9
|-
| style="text-align:left;"| 2018
| style="text-align:left;"| Connecticut
| 27 || 0 || 9.0 || .469 || .000 || .727 || 2.0 || 0.2 || 0.2 || 0.2 || 0.6 || 3.1
|-
| style="text-align:left;"| 2019
| style="text-align:left;"| Connecticut
| 27 || 0 || 8.4 || .467 || .000 || .667 || 2.2 || 0.3 || 0.3 || 0.3 || 0.7 || 3.5
|-
| style="text-align:left;"| 2020
| style="text-align:left;"| Connecticut
| 21 || 21 || 26.1 || .605 || 1.000 || .691 || 5.6 || 1.0 || 1.7 || 0.7 || 1.6 || 11.2
|-
| style="text-align:left;"| 2021
| style="text-align:left;"| Connecticut
| 32 || 32 || 30.6 || .571 || .000 || .796 || 7.3 || 1.8 || 1.4 || 0.5 || 2.2 || 14.7
|-
| style="text-align:left;"| 2022
| style="text-align:left;"| Connecticut
| 36 || 7 || 25.1 || .571 || .000 || .844 || 5.1 || 1.3 || 1.2 || 0.4 || 1.5 || 13.8
|-
| style="text-align:left;"| Career
| style="text-align:left;"| 6 years, 1 team
| 166 || 60 || 18.4 || .562 || .091 || .784 || 4.1 || 0.8 || 0.9 || 0.4 || 1.2 || 8.7

Postseason

|-
| style="text-align:left;"| 2019
| style="text-align:left;"| Connecticut
| 8 || 0 || 4.4 || .625 || .000 || 1.000 || 0.9 || 0.3 || 0.4 || 0.0 || 0.5 || 1.5
|-
| style="text-align:left;"| 2020
| style="text-align:left;"| Connecticut
| 7 || 7 || 28.3 || .453 || .000 || .889 || 7.3 || 1.4 || 1.6 || 0.3 || 1.4 || 9.4
|-
| style="text-align:left;"| 2021
| style="text-align:left;"| Connecticut
| 4 || 4 || 25.8 || .594|| .000 || .643 || 4.3 || 0.5 || 1.5 || 0.8 || 1.5 || 11.8
|-
| style="text-align:left;"| 2022
| style="text-align:left;"| Connecticut
| 12 || 0 || 21.3 || .522 || .000 || .711 || 4.0 || 1.3 || 0.9 || 0.3 || 1.2 || 10.3
|-
| style="text-align:left;"| Career
| style="text-align:left;"| 4 years, 1 team
| 31 || 11 || 19.1 || .515 || .000 || .730 || 4.0 || 1.0 || 1.0 || 0.3 || 1.1 || 8.0

References

1995 births
Living people
All-American college women's basketball players
American expatriate basketball people in the Czech Republic
American expatriate basketball people in Russia
American women's basketball players
Basketball players from Baltimore
Centers (basketball)
Connecticut Sun draft picks
Connecticut Sun players
Maryland Terrapins women's basketball players
People from Aberdeen, Maryland
Power forwards (basketball)
USK Praha players
Women's National Basketball Association All-Stars